Dear Ex  is a 2018 Taiwanese comedy-drama film co-directed by  Mag Hsu and Hsu Chih-yen. It stars Roy Chiu, Hsieh Ying-xuan, Spark Chen and Joseph Huang. The film received generally positive reviews from critics and was selected as the Taiwanese entry for the Best International Feature Film at the 92nd Academy Awards, but it was not nominated.

Synopsis
A teenager, Song Cheng-xi (Huang), becomes trapped in the middle of a bitter feud between his mother (Hsieh) and a free-spirited man (Chiu), who is both the lover and insurance beneficiary of Song's recently deceased father (Chen).

Cast
Roy Chiu as Jay
Hsieh Ying-xuan as Liu San-lian
Spark Chen as Song Zheng-yuan 
Joseph Huang as Song Cheng-xi
Wanfang as Consultant
Allen Kao as Jay's mother
Yang Li-yin as San-lian's sister
Liang Cheng-chun as Stage manager
Wu Ting-chien as Director

Awards and nominations

See also
 List of submissions to the 92nd Academy Awards for Best International Feature Film
 List of Taiwanese submissions for the Academy Award for Best International Feature Film

References

External links
 

2018 films
Taiwanese comedy-drama films
Taiwanese LGBT-related films
2018 comedy-drama films
2018 LGBT-related films
2010s Mandarin-language films
Television shows written by Mag Hsu
Mandarin-language Netflix original films